Derby Revolution of Bakersfield (DRB) is a women's flat track roller derby league based in Bakersfield, California. Founded in 2008, DRB consists of a single travel team which competes against teams from other leagues, and is a member of the Women's Flat Track Derby Association (WFTDA).

History
Derby Revolution of Bakersfield was founded in 2008 by Tonya "Tonka Toy" Warren, who was inspired by watching Rollergirls on television. 
Derby Revolution of Bakersfield was accepted into the Women's Flat Track Derby Association Apprentice program in December 2009, and graduated to full WFTDA membership at the end of 2010.

WFTDA rankings

References

Sports in Bakersfield, California
Roller derby leagues in California
Women's Flat Track Derby Association Division 3
Roller derby leagues established in 2008
2008 establishments in California